Qahremanabad (also Romanized as Qahremānābād; also known as Ālīās) is a village in Azari Rural District, in the Central District of Esfarayen County, North Khorasan Province, Iran. At the 2006 census, its population was 435, in 101 families.

References 

Populated places in Esfarayen County